Tehama may refer to:

 Tehama bonifatella, a species of the moth in the monotypic genus Tehama
 Tehama, California, United States, a city
 Tehama County, California, in which the city is situated
 Mount Tehama, a now-eroded volcano in the Cascade Range in northern California
 Tihamah, a region of the western Arabian Peninsula
 Tehama Inc., a Desktop-as-a-Service vendor